Kobresia sibirica, the Siberian bog sedge, is a plant species known from arctic and alpine tundra in Siberia, the Russian Far East, Alaska, Yukon, the Canadian Northwest Territories, Nunavut, British Columbia, Colorado (several counties in the Rockies), Utah (Duchesne County), Montana (Carbon County), and Wyoming (Park County). Some authorities have considered the North American collections as distinct species (K. macrocarpa, described from Colorado, and K. hyperborea from the Canadian Arctic), but they are more often tentatively regarded as conspecific with K. siberica, but this is pending further investigation.

Kobresia sibirica is a perennial herb spreading by means of underground rhizomes. Culms are up to 40 cm tall. Leaves are narrow and thread-like, up to 15 cm long. Lower spikelets generally have both pistillate and staminate flowers, while uppermost spikelets are staminate only.

References

Cyperaceae
Plants described in 1852
Flora of Russia
Flora of Siberia
Flora of Alaska
Flora of Nunavut
Flora of the Northwest Territories
Flora of British Columbia
Flora of Wyoming
Flora of Colorado
Flora of Utah
Flora of Montana
Flora without expected TNC conservation status